Fritz Schäffer (12 May 1888 – 29 March 1967) was a German politician of the Bavarian People's Party (BVP) and the Christian Social Union (CSU). He was the Bavarian Minister of Finance from 1931 to 1933, when the Nazis came to power in Berlin. In 1945 he became the first Minister President of Bavaria to hold office after the end of the Second World War. From 1949 to 1957, he was the West German federal Minister of Finance and, from 1957 to 1961, federal Minister of Justice.

Biography
Fritz Schäffer was born in 1888 as the son of Gottfried Schäffer and Amalia Mayr. He went to school in Ingolstadt, Munich and Neuburg an der Donau, afterwards studying law in Munich. He joined as a volunteer the Bavarian Infanterie-Leib-Regiment in 1915. After service in Serbia and Tyrol, he was wounded at Verdun in May 1916 and released from army service.

Schäffer started working for the Bavarian state government in 1917. He married Else Dyroff in September 1917.

He was imprisoned from 1933 until 1934, after which he worked as a lawyer. He was imprisoned again in Dachau concentration camp after the July 20 Plot until the end of World War II, from August to October 1944.

Politics
From 1918 to 1933, Schäffer was a member of the BVP. In 1929, he became chairman of this Bavarian regionalist party. From 1920 to 1933, he was a member of the Landtag of Bavaria. In his early political career, he made some anti-Semitic speeches, a fact that would haunt him in his later political life. Nevertheless, he opposed the Nazis' rise to power in Bavaria and  took part in the formation of the Bayernwacht in 1931, an organisation aimed at protecting conservative politicians from the SA. He aimed at forming a coalition, which would include the Nazi Party and the Centre Party, arguing that such a step would neutralise the Nazi party to some extent. After this failed, he attempted to elevate the last Bavarian crown prince, Rupprecht, to the dictatorial position of Staatskommissar. The move ultimately failed due to the resistance of Bavarian prime minister, Heinrich Held, who feared that Schäffer would be made prime minister in his stead.

In 1933, he found himself imprisoned for his actions against the Nazis.

In 1945 he was among the founders of the CSU. He was engaged in continuous strife with the party leader, Josef Müller over party politics. Müller wished to make the party multi-confessional, while Schäffer tried to move it towards a revival of the Catholic-dominated BVP. He was made the first postwar prime minister of Bavaria by General George S. Patton in 1945, but was relieved of his post by General Dwight D. Eisenhower after a couple of months, when his anti-Semitic past became known. Eisenhower, unlike Patton, also disliked the fact that Schäffer hired ex-Nazis for his administration. He was barred from politics by the US authorities until 1948, accused of being a Nazi sympathizer. He managed to clear himself of this charge and reentered politics afterwards.

From 1949 to 1961, he was a member of the Bundestag. He became Minister of Finance of the new Federal Republic of Germany in 1949 and held this post until 1957. In 1957, after elections, Konrad Adenauer, chancellor of Germany, attempted to remove Schäffer from his cabinet as his tight fiscal policies were felt as a hindrance to Germany's economic growth. After political negotiations, Schäffer was awarded the justice ministry instead.

During his time as German Minister of Finance, he became the second-most powerful man in federal politics. He was known for his tight fiscal policies, aimed at keeping the German currency stable. In this role, he strongly resisted any reparation claims to victims of the Nazi reign. After German rearmament, Schäffer was engaged in many arguments about defense spending, often irritating his NATO partners by his refusals to allocate more money to it.

See also
List of German finance ministers
The Last Days of Patton

References

Further reading
 Fritz Schäffer 1945-67, (in German), by Christoph Henzler, Munich, Hans Seidel Stiftung
 Fritz Schäffer als Politiker der Bayrischen Volkspartei, (in German), by Otto Altendorfer

External links
 Bavarian government website - Fritz Schäffer (in German)
 Paying for the Past google book review, author: Christian Pross, Belinda Cooper, publisher: JHU Press
 
 

German Roman Catholics
Finance ministers of Germany
Ministers of the Bavaria State Government
Members of the Bundestag for Bavaria
Members of the Bundestag 1949–1953
Bavarian People's Party politicians
Members of the Landtag of Bavaria
Grand Crosses 1st class of the Order of Merit of the Federal Republic of Germany
1888 births
1967 deaths
Politicians from Munich
German Army personnel of World War I
People from the Kingdom of Bavaria
Military personnel of Bavaria
Ministers-President of Bavaria
Dachau concentration camp survivors
Members of the Bundestag for the Christian Social Union in Bavaria